State auditors (also known as state comptrollers, state controllers, state examiners, or inspectors general) are fiscal officers lodged in the executive or legislative branches of U.S. state governments who serve as External auditors, financial controllers, bookkeepers, or inspectors general of public funds. The office of state auditor may be a creature of the state constitution or one created by statutory law.

Selection

Method
The mode of selecting the state auditor varies among the many states and territories. In 24 states, the state auditor is a constitutional officer elected by the voters or the state legislature for specified terms of office. For example, state auditors in California, Idaho, Illinois, Minnesota, Nevada, Pennsylvania, Texas, and Washington are elected by the voters. Maine and Tennessee are the only states where the state auditor is elected by the legislature. In the remaining states, the state auditor is appointed by and serves at the pleasure of the governor or the relevant state legislature. In those states where the state auditor is appointed by the governor, the appointment is always subject to either legislative nomination or confirmation.

Quantity
Several states have both an elected auditor serving alongside another auditor that is appointed by and reports exclusively to the legislature. Government auditing arrangements in Minnesota, Utah, and Washington reflect this model. Under such circumstances, the respective jurisdictions of the aforementioned officials is such so that their responsibilities complement one another. In the case of Washington for instance, the state auditor conducts independent audits and investigations of the fiscal condition of local governments and state agencies alike, while the legislative auditor evaluates state agency financial management and performance in support of the legislature's oversight functions. This division of government auditing responsibility is in keeping with two core principles of state and local government auditing in the United States:
A state auditor elected by the people is functionally independent from all other public officials and is therefore duly empowered to superintend and verify the condition of public accounts, funds, and resources without fear of reprisal. Barring other constitutional remedies, only the voters can remove and replace an elected state auditor. This institutional independence combats corruption and promotes government accountability directly to the electorate in the spirit of Jacksonian democracy.
A legislative auditor subject to the direction and supervision of the state legislature ensures that the legislature, which appropriates funds and establishes program goals in public policy, will ultimately review program expenditures and results. Thus, state government is accountable to the people through their elected representatives.

Powers and duties
Supervising public finances and improving the efficiency and effectiveness of public administration are the primary business of America's state auditors. However, distinctions exist in their functions. Generally speaking, external auditors and inspectors general conduct financial, compliance, or performance audits of public accounts in order to detect and prevent waste, fraud, and abuse of public funds and resources. Financial controllers, on the other hand, exist to maintain budgetary and accounting control over public spending on behalf of their respective state. In these respects, financial controllers are charged with operating the state accounting system, administering payroll, ordering or approving disbursements, enforcing internal control, and preparing financial reports, among related responsibilities.

Variations on the conceptual models
Public organizational theory and state law do not always clearly distinguish the functions of America's state auditors based on their official titles. In fact, the elected financial controllers in Arkansas, Indiana, South Dakota, and Wyoming are designated as "state auditor. Meanwhile, New Jersey's inspector general is named the "state comptroller" and Tennessee's external auditor is constitutionally the "comptroller of the treasury". This etymological discrepancy is the result of the government accounting profession evolving over the course of American history and provides, in part, for many variations on the conceptual models. Some state auditors perform functions altogether unrelated to public-sector accounting or auditing. Of note, New York combines the normally disparate functions of government accounting and government auditing into its elected state comptroller, with the incumbent also managing public pensions and investing state funds. No other state or territory consolidates so much financial power into a single state auditor. 

On the other hand, some states constrain the authority of their auditors to specific functions. For example, the bulk of the Alabama state auditor's responsibilities entail inventorying state personal property, with only a limited role for financial audits of the state treasurer's and state comptroller's accounts. South Dakota's state auditor is broadly responsible for preauditing state agency claims and vouchers, issuing warrants on the state treasurer to pay funds out of the treasury, and administering payroll. However, no other functional responsibilities within the government machinery applicable to financial controllership have been assigned to the South Dakota state auditor. Rather, a separate state agency under the direction of the governor maintains the state accounting system, develops and maintains internal controls, and preparing financial reports, in addition to preparing and administering the state budget. Montana's state auditor does not even audit public funds or maintain fiscal control over the state treasury in the traditional sense. Rather, the auditorregulates Montana's securities and insurance industries.

Scope of audit authority
For the majority of states where the state auditor audits public accounts, their scope of authority encompasses all state agencies. In a plurality of these same states, the auditor's  jurisdiction also extends to local governments. Government auditing arrangements are unique in Illinois, Minnesota, New Jersey, and West Virginia however with respect to the fact that their respective state auditors primarily or exclusively audit local governments. In the case of the Illinois comptroller and West Virginia state auditor, these elected state auditors also serve as financial controllers of state agencies. To the contrary, New Jersey's state comptroller functions as an inspector general for the executive branch of state government and is a member of the governor's cabinet. Minnesota is particularly unique. In that state, the state auditor, who is elected, is the only state auditor in the United States to broadly supervise and audit the fiscal concerns of local governments. In fact, nearly 5,000 local governments which altogether spend some $40 billion annually come under the state auditor's purview. With that said, the state auditor's authority over state agencies extends only to the statewide single audit of federal funds spent by state agencies and their subrecipients. A separate legislative auditor appointed by and reporting to the state legislature is responsible for audits and evaluations of state agency financial management and performance.

Miscellaneous responsibilities
As independently chosen external auditors, financial controllers and inspectors general, America's state auditors exist to safeguard public finances from misappropriation and maladministration. In short, their work combats corruption and keeps government accountable for the efficient and effective use of tax dollars. Nevertheless, their accounting and auditing activities are frequently put to use for connected purposes. In Colorado for instance, the state auditor reports on the effectiveness of health exchanges and marijuana legalization. Meanwhile, California's state auditor is involved in the redistricting process.

Professional standards
State financial controllers prepare financial statements and keep accounts in accordance with Generally Accepted Accounting Principles issued by the Governmental Accounting Standards Board. Meanwhile, state external auditors and inspectors general exercise their authority in accordance with Government Auditing Standards (GAGAS) promulgated by the comptroller general of the United States, the head of the U.S. Government Accountability Office. Otherwise known as the "Yellow Book", GAGAS prescribes best practice for auditing state agencies and local governments in the United States. In the case of inspectors general, they are also subject to Quality Standards for Inspections and Evaluations prescribed by the Council of the Inspectors General on Integrity and Efficiency, an independent committee created by an Act of Congress consisting of the U.S. government's many inspectors general.

Professional affiliations
State external auditors and financial controllers in the United States - whether elected or appointed - are organized nationally as the National State Auditors' Association and the National Association of State Comptrollers. Both secretariats are housed within the National Association of State Auditors, Comptrollers and Treasurers. State inspectors general belong to the Association of Inspectors General.

Tables of America's state auditors

Elected state auditors in the United States

Appointed state auditors in the United States

See also
State constitutional officer
Governor (United States)
Lieutenant governor (United States)
State attorney general
State treasurer
Secretary of state (U.S. state government)
List of U.S. statewide elected officials

References

External links
Auditors and Comptroller 2018

 
State government in the United States